Alexios Doukas Philanthropenos (died ) was a Byzantine nobleman and distinguished admiral, with the rank of protostrator and later megas doux, during the reign of Michael VIII Palaiologos.

Biography
Alexios is the first important member of the Philanthropenos family mentioned in the sources. He first appears in George Akropolites's history in autumn 1255 as a military commander in the region of Ohrid — perhaps as governor (doux) of the local thema — during the wars of Theodore II Laskaris against the Bulgarians.

Throughout the 1260s, Philanthropenos carried the title of protostrator. Theoretically, he was subordinate to the megas doux Michael Laskaris, but the latter was old and infirm, and Philanthropenos exercised the de facto command of the Byzantine navy. In 1262 or 1263, soon after the recapture of Constantinople from the Latins, Emperor Michael VIII Palaiologos sent him to raid the Latin possessions of the Aegean Sea. This was the first major expedition undertaken by Palaiologos's recently expanded and reorganized navy, and Philanthropenos's ships were manned by the new corps of the Gasmouloi and the Prosalentai. The Byzantines raided and sacked the islands of Paros, Naxos, and Keos, as well as the towns of Karystos and Oreoi on Negroponte (Euboea), before sailing south to support the operations of an expeditionary force that landed at Monemvasia against the Principality of Achaea.

In 1270, he was possibly the general who commanded the army that landed at Monemvasia, and for the next years operated in the Morea against the Achaeans. Both sides in this conflict avoided a potentially disastrous direct confrontation, instead focusing on raids in order to plunder and devastate their opponent's territory. During the early 1270s, Philanthropenos led his fleet several times against the Latins, supporting Licario, an imperial vassal, in Negroponte, and participating in the great Byzantine naval victory at the Battle of Demetrias, during which he was heavily wounded. For this success, he was raised to the rank of megas doux, now vacant after Michael Laskaris's death.

Philanthropenos died around 1275, and was succeeded as megas doux soon after by Licario.

Family
Alexios had one daughter, Maria, who married the protovestiarios Michael Tarchaneiotes. Their second son was the pinkernes Alexios Philanthropenos the Younger, a prominent general who scored several successes against the Turks, and who led an unsuccessful rebellion against Andronikos II Palaiologos in 1295.

References

Citations

Sources

13th-century births
1270s deaths
Megaloi doukes
13th-century Byzantine people
Alexios 01
Protostratores